A Master of Biology (or MBiol) is a master's degree in the field of the biological sciences. This field includes the study of topics like plant biology, molecular biology, and animal biology. This is a higher degree taken in a graduate school at a university. This degree is usually specific to those who have accomplished their undergraduate studies in any field of natural science.

Content And Structure 
In the UK, the MBiol degree is an undergraduate award, available after pursuing a four-year course of study at a university. It is classed as a level 7 qualification in the National Qualifications Framework. In Scotland the MBiol degree is a 5-year course. In terms of course structure, MBiol degrees have the same content that is usually seen in other degree programmes. There are also usually one or more substantial projects undertaken in the fourth year, which may well have research elements. At the end of the second or third years, there is usually a threshold of academic performance in examinations to be reached to allow progression into the final year. Final results are awarded on the standard British undergraduate degree classification scale. After one has finished their Master of Biology degree, they can become a researcher or a professor for undergraduate studies, or they can pursue a doctorate.

Master's degrees